Omar Souhaili (born 19 July 1989), better known by his stage name
Dizzy DROS, is a Moroccan rapper, songwriter and producer.

Early life and career
Born in Casablanca, Morocco, Dizzy DROS was raised in Bine Lemdoune, a popular neighbourhood in Casablanca. DROS stands for 'Da Rhymes of Streets' although he is also known as Mr. Cazafonia. Dizzy DROS started to write songs and to develop his personal style in rap at the age of 17.
 
For over four years the rapper worked on different demos singles before releasing "Cazafonia". It was at the beginning of his career that DROS met Khalid Douache (DJ Key), a member of the Moroccan hip hop scene who directed the video "Cazafonia" in 2011.

In September 2013, DROS performed in the music festival L'Boulevard des Jeunes Musiciens.
Later on, in December 2013, Dizzy DROS performed in the Centre Culturel Renaissance in Rabat as the invited artist of the project "Fábrica de Rimas". Dizzy DROS shared stage with the Colombian rappers C15 and the Moroccan rap group H-Kayne.

His first album '3azzy 3ando Stylo' (33S) was released on 22 November 2013. The official release took place at the Instituto Cervantes of Casablanca.  The album contains 21 tracks including an intro, an outro and two skits, as well as collaborations with Moroccan rappers such as Muslim, Shayfeen, M-Doc and Would Chaab. The songs of the album dwell on the life of Moroccan urban youth.

Dizzy DROS has participated in TV and Radio shows. DROS was invited in January 2013 to the talk show Génération News to participate in a debate on Moroccan artists and Internet. DROS also appeared in the programs Ni9ach 2.0 and Ajial, both in the Moroccan public TV channel 2M. The rapper was featured many times in the 'Momo Morning Show' on Hit Radio and the program 'Arts Mag' in Medina FM. Dizzy DROS has also been interviewed by Moroccan written press such as the newspaper Libération.

On 1 February 2014, Dizzy DROS was invited to perform at the 7th Edition of the Maroc Web Awards that took place at the National Theatre Mohamed V in Rabat.

In 2019, Dizzy DROS gained even bigger attention by releasing "Moutanabbi", a track in which he dissed Moroccan rapper .

Dizzy DROS voiced the character "Measurehead" in the 2019 video game, Disco Elysium.

The music video for the February 14, 2023 release "M3a L3echrane", featuring impersonations of public figures and containing a variety of political and social critiques, was viewed over ten million times on YouTube in its first five days.

Critical response
3azzy 3ando Stylo is considered by the magazine TelQuel as "one of the best hip hop albums of these last ten years" in Morocco.  The magazine Aujourd'hui Le Maroc described Dizzy DROS' rap style as "an impressive flow, an improvisation that flirts with the mastery of words."

Dizzy Dros was one of the singers that took part in the 2022 FIFA Club World Cup official song entitled “Welcome to Morocco”, that took place in Morocco.

Discography
Album
 3azzy 3ando Stylo (Black With Style) (2013)
 
 Ta7ad Ma3arf (Nobody Knows)
 Omar Smity (Omar Is My Name)
 Bouzebbal (Trash People)
 Kat3raf T3oum (Do You Know How To Swim)
 Malkom (What's Wrong With Y'all)
 3andk Cha3la (Dak Jwane) (Got A Lighter? (That Weed) )
 Tebwi9a (High)
 10 Millions Feat. M-DOC 
 Ghadi Tfi9 (Interlude 1) (You Gonna Wake Up)
 Sa3tk Salat Feat. Slim R.W. (Your Time's Over)
 Sa3tk Salat Pt. 2 [Short Version] (Your Time's Over Part 2)
 3alam (Crazy World)
 3azzy 3ando Stylo (Black With Style)
 Ka3i? (Interlude 2) (Angry?)
 L'Benj Feat. Shayfeen (Anesthesia)
 Ghetto Boy
 Koun Makentch Ana Feat. Muslim (If I Wasn't Me)
 Nhar F'Zan9a Feat. Would Chaab (A Day In The Street)
 Liberta (Skit) (Freedom)
 Ta7ad Ma Ghay 7bessni (Nobody's Gonna Stop Me)
 Outro

Mixtape 

 3azzy 3ando Style [Mixtape: 3azzy 3ando Stylo]

 "Msa7ha Fiya" (February 2012)

Singles

 "Cazafonia" (November 2011)
 "Msa7ha Fiya" (February 2012)
 "Men Hna" (June 2012)
 "Freestyle" Feat. Raiss Junior aka RJ (September 2012)
 "Zan9a Kat Hdar" (November 2012)
 "Chkoun Ta" (January 2013)
 "K7al Rass" (April 2014)
 "Chkoun 7na" (June 2014)
 "Gleb Down L'up" (August 2014)
 "Mantsayedch" Feat. Muslim, Shayfeen, Ahmed Soultan (November 2014)
 "LJAM" (April 2015)
 "Gha Dawi" (September 2015)
 "Mafehmounich" Feat. KOMY (May 2016)
 "Fo9 Chouwaya" Feat. KOMY (May 2016)
 "Sality Wla Ba91" (September 2016)
 "Todo bien - Hna bikher" Feat. King dest (July 2017)
 "PARIS" (12 January 2018)
 "Makat3rafnich" Feat. Ard Adz (14 March 2018)
 "Lkora 7na Maliha (Moul Ballon)"  (June 2018)
 "RDLBAL" Feat. KOMY (Sep 2018)
 "MOUTANABBI" (January 6, 2019)
 "AIRMAX" (September 19, 2019)
 "MOUTANABBI Vol.2" (January 6, 2020)
 "NOTA" (November 11, 2020)
 "KOBE" Feat. Anys (March 17, 2021)
 "HABEEL"(October 31, 2021)
 "M3A L3ECHRANE" (February 14, 2023)

Leaked and unreleased 

 "L'3a9a Katdwi" (November 4, 2014)
 "7ALMA" (March 28, 2020)

References

Living people
1989 births
Moroccan rappers
People from Casablanca